WAFC (590 AM) is a classic country radio station licensed to Clewiston, Florida, United States. The station is currently owned by Glades Media Company LLP.

On June 30, 2014, Cumulus Media Networks stopped distributing the network True Oldies Channel, and WAFC switched to Westwood One's Classic Hits Radio.

Previously, the station played a regional Mexican format with the branding Radio Fiesta. Prior to that it played a country music format.

On December 26, 2018, WAFC changed their format from classic hits to classic country, branded as "Pure Country WAFC".

Translators

Previous logo

References

External links

AFC
Classic country radio stations in the United States
1988 establishments in Florida
Radio stations established in 1988